Finite number may refer to:
 A countable number less than infinity, being the cardinality of a finite set – i.e., some natural number, possibly 0
 A real number, such as may result from a measurement (of time, length, area, etc.)
 In mathematical parlance, a value other than infinite or infinitesimal values and distinct from the value 0

See also
 Finite (disambiguation)